"I Hate Everything" is a song written by Gary Harrison and Keith Stegall, and recorded by American country music singer George Strait. It was released in July 2004 as the lead single from his compilation album, 50 Number Ones. The song reached the top of the Billboard Hot Country Singles & Tracks chart in October 2004 and peaked at number 35 on the Billboard Hot 100.

Content
The protagonist of the song is in a bar and runs into a man who hates everything due to his now ex-wife leaving him for another man. It turns out the protagonist has come into the bar after an argument with his own wife. After he has heard the man's story, he calls his wife and says he is coming home, and they are going to work out their differences. The song ends with the protagonist paying for the man's drinks and thanking him for everything.

Chart positions
"I Hate Everything" debuted at number 41 on the U.S. Billboard Hot Country Singles & Tracks for the week of July 17, 2004.

Year-end charts

References

2004 singles
George Strait songs
Songs written by Gary Harrison
Songs written by Keith Stegall
Song recordings produced by Tony Brown (record producer)
MCA Nashville Records singles
2004 songs